Gaylocator, stylized as GAYLOCATOR, is a travel guide aimed toward gay travellers to Europe. The guide is updated annually by Global Productions, based in Prague.

See also 

 Gay tourism
 International Gay and Lesbian Travel Association
 LGBT cruises

References

External links 
 

Consumer guides
LGBT-related mass media in Europe
LGBT tourism
Gay male mass media
Travel guide books